Wayne David Cottrell (30 September 1943 – 22 May 2013) was a New Zealand rugby union player. A first or second five-eighth, Cottrell represented Canterbury at a provincial level, and was a member of the New Zealand national side, the All Blacks, from 1967 to 1971. He played 37 matches for the All Blacks including nine internationals.

References

1943 births
2013 deaths
New Zealand rugby union players
New Zealand international rugby union players
Canterbury rugby union players
Rugby union fly-halves
Rugby union centres
Bakers
Rugby union players from Christchurch